Manila is an unincorporated community in southern Pettis County, in the U.S. state of Missouri.

The community is on Missouri Route E one mile north of Missouri Route 52 and three miles north of the Pettis-Benton county line. Sedalia is approximately eleven miles to the north-northeast.

History
A post office called Manila was established in 1898, and remained in operation until 1904. The community takes its name from the Philippine capital of Manila.

References

Unincorporated communities in Pettis County, Missouri
Unincorporated communities in Missouri